The 1960 U.S. Women's Open was the 15th U.S. Women's Open, held July 21–23 at Worcester Country Club in Worcester, Massachusetts. It was the eighth conducted by the United States Golf Association (USGA).

Betsy Rawls won her fourth U.S. Women's Open, a stroke ahead of runner-up Joyce Ziske. Two-time defending champion Mickey Wright led by two strokes after 36 holes on Friday, but a difficult Saturday dropped her to fifth. She entered the championship with an ailing knee. It was the seventh of eight major championships for Rawls.

The low amateur was also the youngest competitor: 15-year-old Judy Torluemke (later Rankin) finished at 326 (+38), in 24th place.

The championship was held the same week as the PGA Championship, which concluded on Sunday.

Past champions in the field

Source:

Final leaderboard
Saturday, July 23, 1960

Source:

References

External links
USGA final leaderboard
U.S. Women's Open Golf Championship
U.S. Women's Open – past champions – 1960
Worcester Country Club

U.S. Women's Open
U.S. Women's Open
U.S. Women's Open
Golf in Massachusetts
Sports competitions in Worcester, Massachusetts
U.S. Women's Open
U.S. Women's Open
Women's sports in Massachusetts